Daisy L. Elliott (November 26, 1917 – December 22, 2015), was an American politician and realtor from the state of Michigan.

Early life
Elliott was born Daisy Elizabeth Lenoir in Filbert, West Virginia, and resided in Detroit, Michigan. She was a delegate to the 1961–1962 Michigan Constitutional Convention from Wayne County's 4th district, which resulted in Michigan's Constitution of 1963.

Career
A Democrat, she represented Wayne County's 4th district in the Michigan House of Representatives from 1963 to 1964, Michigan's 22nd district, which replaced Wayne County's 4th district, from 1965 to 1972, and Michigan's 8th district from 1973 to 1978. She was an unsuccessful candidate in the primary for the Michigan Senate 5th district in 1978. then regained her old seat in the Michigan House in 1980. In politics, Elliott was nothing if not persistent: she was defeated five times in the primaries for State Representative (the 1st district in 1950, the 11th district in 1954, and the 4th district in 1956, 1958 and 1960) before finally winning in 1962.

While serving in the Michigan State House of Representatives, she co-authored the Elliott-Larsen Civil Rights Act, which passed in 1976.

In April 1982, Elliott was arrested for possessing a stolen 1977 Cadillac. She was defeated by Carolyn Cheeks Kilpatrick in the Democratic primary that year, and, after numerous appeals, had her conviction upheld in 1984. She served sixty days in jail before being released in June 1985.

Political career
She was a member of Democratic Party, National Association for the Advancement of Colored People (NAACP), League of Women Voters, and Junior League. She died on December 22, 2015, aged 98, at DMC Sinai-Grace Hospital in Detroit. She is interred at Woodlawn Cemetery near the Rosa L. Parks Freedom Chapel.

References

External links

1917 births
2015 deaths
African-American state legislators in Michigan
Democratic Party members of the Michigan House of Representatives
Politicians from Detroit
People from McDowell County, West Virginia
Businesspeople from Michigan
Women state legislators in Michigan
American real estate brokers
Burials at Woodlawn Cemetery (Detroit)
African-American women in politics
20th-century American businesspeople
20th-century African-American women
20th-century African-American people
21st-century African-American people
21st-century African-American women